Ghost in the Shell is a media franchise originally released as a manga by Masamune Shirow. It has since been translated into animated films, animated television series, a live action film, prose, and video games with similar titles.

Ghost in the Shell may specifically refer to:
 Ghost in the Shell (manga), the manga produced by Masamune Shirow (including the original Ghost in the Shell, Ghost in the Shell 2 and Ghost in the Shell 1.5 produced from 1989 to 1997)

Film and television
 Ghost in the Shell (1995 film), an animated film based on the Masamune Shirow manga
 Ghost in the Shell 2: Innocence, a 2004 sequel to the 1995 film
 Ghost in the Shell: Stand Alone Complex, a 2002–2006 anime television series (2 seasons)
 Ghost in the Shell: Stand Alone Complex - Solid State Society, a 2006 Stand Alone Complex made-for-TV movie
 Ghost in the Shell: Arise, a 2013–2015 OVA and anime television series
 Ghost in the Shell: The New Movie, a 2015 animated film continuing from Arise
 Ghost in the Shell (2017 film), a live-action film starring Scarlett Johansson
 Ghost in the Shell: SAC 2045, a 2020 anime Netflix series

Video games
 Ghost in the Shell (video game), a 1997 PlayStation game based on Ghost in the Shell
 Ghost in the Shell: Stand Alone Complex (2004 video game), based on Stand Alone Complex for the PlayStation 2
 Ghost in the Shell: Stand Alone Complex (2005 video game), based on Stand Alone Complex for the PlayStation Portable, sequel to the PS2 game
 Ghost in the Shell: Stand Alone Complex - First Assault Online, a 2015 first-person shooter video game based on Ghost in the Shell: Stand Alone Complex series

See also
 Ghost in the machine (disambiguation)